The Ozark Mountain forests are a temperate broadleaf and mixed forests ecoregion of the central United States delineated by the World Wide Fund for Nature. The ecoregion covers an area of 23,900 square miles (62,000 square kilometers) in northern Arkansas and eastern Oklahoma.

The Boston Mountains and Ouachita Mountains are the main mountain ranges of the region.

See also
List of ecoregions in the United States (WWF)
U.S. Interior Highlands
Ozarks
Ozark–St. Francis National Forest
Ouachita Mountains
Ouachita National Forest

References

External links
 

Ozarks
Temperate broadleaf and mixed forests in the United States
U.S. Interior Highlands
Protected areas of the U.S. Interior Highlands
Ecoregions of the United States
Natural history of Arkansas
Natural history of Oklahoma
Montane forests
Nearctic ecoregions
Forests of Arkansas
Forests of Oklahoma